The 2003 Internationaux de Strasbourg was a women's tennis tournament played on outdoor clay courts. It was the 17st edition of the Internationaux de Strasbourg, and was part of the Tier III Series of the 2003 WTA Tour. The tournament took place at the Centre Sportif de Hautepierre in Strasbourg, France, from 19 May until 24 May 2003. Seventh-seeded Silvia Farina Elia won her third consecutive singles title at the event and earned $27,000 first-prize money.

Finals

Singles

 Silvia Farina Elia defeated  Karolina Šprem 6–3, 4–6, 6–4
 It was Farina Elia's 1st singles title of the year and the 3rd of her career.

Doubles

 Sonya Jeyaseelan /  Maja Matevžič defeated  Laura Granville /  Jelena Kostanić 6–4, 6–4

References

External links
 ITF tournament edition details 
 Tournament draws

2003 WTA Tour
2003
IInternationaux de Strasbourg
May 2003 sports events in Europe